John James Spedding (1 October 1912 – December 1982) was an English professional footballer who played in the Football League as a right half for Gateshead, Huddersfield Town and Chesterfield. He also played three games, scoring once, for Darlington before the 1939–40 season was abandoned because of the Second World War. He was born in Keighley, Yorkshire, and died in Connah's Quay, Flintshire, Wales.

Personal information 
He was married in 1945 to Hilda Swain (1917-2008) and lived in Cheshire until his death in 1982. They had four daughters.

References

1912 births
1982 deaths
Sportspeople from Keighley
English footballers
Association football midfielders
Gateshead F.C. players
Huddersfield Town A.F.C. players
Chesterfield F.C. players
Darlington F.C. players
Worksop Town F.C. players
English Football League players